Pius Cheung is a percussionist and composer, called "a young Chinese-Canadian virtuoso," by The New York Times. Born in China, he moved to British Columbia at age twelve. He received his bachelor's degree from the Curtis Institute of Music in Philadelphia and his doctorate from the University of Michigan. He is currently an associate professor of percussion at the University of Oregon.

References

External links
 Official website

Living people
Canadian percussionists
Hong Kong male composers
Marimbists
University of Michigan alumni
Hong Kong composers
Year of birth missing (living people)